Geoheritage  is a quarterly peer-reviewed scientific journal covering all aspects of global geoheritage, both in situ and portable. It was established in 2009 and is published by Springer Science+Business Media on behalf of the International Association for the Conservation of Geological Heritage.

References

External links

Geology journals
Publications established in 2009
English-language journals
Quarterly journals
Springer Science+Business Media academic journals